Jeannette Pointu is a Belgian comic book series created by Marc Wasterlain, starring the eponymous character.

Comic books 
 Le Fils de l'Inca, 
 Quatre x quatre, 
 Le Dragon vert, 
 Yeren, 
 Reportages, 
 Le Secret atlante, 
 Mission sur Mars, 
 Le Tigre de Tasmanie, 
 Les Femmes girafes, 
 Casque bleu, 
 Le Monstre, 
 Les Fourmis géantes, 
 Le Trésor des calanques, 
 Le Grand Panda, 
 Aventure virtuelle, 
 Les Hommes-feuilles, 
 Opération clonage, 
 2003 : Femmes massaïs, 
 Ngorongoro (Tanzania)
 Burka (Afghanistan)
 Indi (India)
 Road Train (Australia)
 Nying-Ba (Nepal)
 La pédégère (une grande ville)
 2004 : Les Amazones, 
 Les Amazones (Amazonie)
 La pirate (mer de Chine)
 Chien jaune (porte-avions Charles de Gaulle)
 La petite fugueuse (une banlieue)
 Femmes peules (Niger)
 2005 : Chasseurs de Tornades, 
 Chasseurs de tornades (États-Unis)
 Bois d'ébène
 La Reine des sables
 Tambalacoque
 La Mer perdue (mer d'Aral)
 Erébus (Antarctique)

Dupuis titles
Belgian comic strips
Pointu, Jeannette
1982 comics debuts
Pointu, Jeannette
Adventure comics
Pointu, Jeannette
Pointu, Jeanette
Pointu, Jeanette
Pointu, Jeanne